Sand Ridge is an unincorporated community in Houston County, Texas, United States. It is unknown when it was settled, but it is believed it was before 1900. By 1990 it became a dispersed community. Any residents who live there are within the Lovelady ISD.

References

External links

Unincorporated communities in Houston County, Texas
Unincorporated communities in Texas